Lee Jun-young is a Korean name consisting of the family name Lee and the given name Jun-young, and may also refer to:

 Lee Jun-yeong, South Korean basketball player
 Lee Jun-young (footballer) (born 1982), South Korean footballer
 Lee Jun-young (entertainer) (born 1997), South Korean actor and singer